Andre Bellos (born August 13, 1987) is an American actor, singer and dancer who has appeared in the Spike Lee film Chi-Raq and Lee Daniels' television series Empire.
In 2009 he signed a digital distribution deal with Nimbit music and five years later with Georgia-based model/talent agency Babes'n'Beaus. On July 8, 2016, he released his newest song, "Explode" debuting it live on Fox's Good Day Chicago. One month later, he served as guest commentator on the nationally syndicated television show TMZ Live. On October 6 of the same year Andre was a guest on NBC's The Steve Harvey Show as one of Chicago's most eligible bachelors. Men's Lifestyle magazine covered the "Done with Dating hour" episode, making it his 7th cover story to date. Later that month The Chicago Tribune recognized Andre as an, "Actor turned Activist". January 13 of 2017 marked his first sit down interview with the Cw's Lori Moore, where he discussed his "Do the right thing" initiative, traveling state to state in the mid-west volunteering and shedding light on non-for-profit organizations. His break out acting role comes as state attorney investigator Billy Coburn on Dick Wolf's NBC drama Chicago Justice. On November 29, 2017, along with up and coming fashion designer Jessica De La Cruz Altered Mood was launched, a collaborative effort of modern-day accessories.

References

External links
 Official website
 

Living people
Place of birth missing (living people)
American male film actors
American male television actors
1987 births